The 1948 Giro d'Italia was the 31st edition of the Giro d'Italia, one of cycling's Grand Tours. The field consisted of 77 riders, and 41 riders finished the race.

By rider

By nationality

References

1948 Giro d'Italia
1948